The Clemson Tigers baseball team represents Clemson University in NCAA Division I college baseball. The team participates in the Atlantic Division of the Atlantic Coast Conference.  The Tigers are currently coached by head coach Erik Bakich and play their home games in Doug Kingsmore Stadium. The program has reached the NCAA Tournament in all but one season dating back to 1987. Clemson has made 12 appearances in the College World Series with an all-time record of 12–24 in Omaha.

The team has a heated in-state rivalry with the University of South Carolina. Mark Etheridge of SEBaseball.com has called it "college baseball's most heated rivalry," and Aaron Fitt of Baseball America has called it "far and away the most compelling rivalry college baseball has to offer." As of March 5, 2023, The Clemson Tigers lead the all-time series 186-145-2.

Coaching history

Year-by-year results

Award winners

Dick Howser Trophy

Golden Spikes Award

Conference awards
ACC Player of the Year – Craig White (1973), Steve Cline (1974), Denny Walling (1975), Chuck Porter (1976), Jim McCollom (1985), Chuck Baldwin (1986), Brian Barnes (1989), Brian Kowitz (1990), Shane Monahan (1995), Kris Benson (1996), Khalil Greene (2002), Brad Miller (2011), Seth Beer (2016), Max Wagner (2022)

Current MLB players
Seth Beer - Arizona Diamondbacks, infielder 
Steven Duggar - Center fielder, San Francisco Giants
Mike Freeman - Second baseman, Cleveland Indians
Daniel Gossett - Pitcher, Oakland Athletics
Dominic Leone - Pitcher, San Francisco Giants
Brad Miller - Texas Rangers infielder
Spencer Strider - Pitcher, Atlanta Braves
Steve Wilkerson - Second baseman, Baltimore Orioles

Prominent players

See also
List of NCAA Division I baseball programs

References

External links